Northern Territory is a territory in Australia, with 448 species of bird recorded.

This list is based on the 1996 classification by Sibley and Monroe (though there has been a recent (2008) extensive revision of Australian birds by Christidis and Boles), which has resulted in some lumping and splitting. Their system has been developed over nearly two decades and has strong local support, but deviates in important ways from more generally accepted schemes. Supplemental updates follow The Clements Checklist of Birds of the World, 2022 edition.

The following tags have been used to highlight several categories. The commonly occurring native species do not fall into any of these categories.

 (A) Accidental - a species that rarely or accidentally occurs in Northern Territory
 (E) Endemic - a species endemic to Northern Territory
 (I) Introduced - a species introduced to Northern Territory as a consequence, direct or indirect, of human actions

Cassowaries and emu
Order: CasuariiformesFamily: Casuariidae

This family of flightless ratite birds is represented by two living species in Australia. Another two species are found in New Guinea. The extinct, geographically-isolated King and Kangaroo Island emus were historically considered to be separate species to mainland emus. However, genetic evidence from 2011 suggests that all three are conspecific.

Emu, Dromaius novaehollandiae

Magpie goose
Order: AnseriformesFamily: Anseranatidae

The family contains a single species, the magpie goose. It was an early and distinctive offshoot of the anseriform family tree, diverging after the screamers and before all other ducks, geese and swans, sometime in the late Cretaceous. The single species is found across Australia.

Magpie goose, Anseranas semipalmata

Ducks, geese, and waterfowl

Order: AnseriformesFamily: Anatidae

The family Anatidae includes the ducks and most duck-like waterfowl, such as geese and swans. These are adapted for an aquatic existence, with webbed feet, bills that are flattened to a greater or lesser extent, and feathers that are excellent at shedding water due to special oils.

 
Spotted whistling-duck, Dendrocygna guttata (A)
Plumed whistling-duck, Dendrocygna eytoni 
Wandering whistling-duck, Dendrocygna arcuata (A)
Cape Barren goose, Cereopsis novaehollandiae  
Freckled duck, Stictonetta naevosa  
Black swan, Cygnus atratus
Radjah shelduck, Radjah radjah 
Australian shelduck, Tadorna tadornoides 
Green pygmy-goose, Nettapus pulchellus 
Australian wood duck, Chenonetta jubata 
Garganey, Spatula querquedula (A)
Australian shoveler, Spatula rhynchotis
Pacific black duck, Anas superciliosa
Northern pintail, Anas acuta (A)
Gray teal, Anas gracilis
Chestnut teal, Anas castanea 
Pink-eared duck, Malacorhynchus membranaceus 
Hardhead, Aythya australis 
Blue-billed duck, Oxyura australis

Megapodes
Order: GalliformesFamily: Megapodiidae

Megapodiidae are represented by various species in the Australasian region. They are commonly referred to as "mound-builders" due to their habit of constructing large mounds to incubate their eggs.

Malleefowl, 	Leipoa ocellata (extirpated)
Orange-footed scrubfowl Megapodius reinwardt

Pheasants, grouse, and allies
Order: GalliformesFamily: Phasianidae

Phasianidae consists of the pheasants and their allies. These are terrestrial species, variable in size but generally plump, with broad, relatively short wings. Many species are gamebirds or have been domesticated as a food source for humans.

Brown quail, Synoicus ypsilophora
Blue-breasted quail, Synoicus chinensis
Stubble quail, Coturnix pectoralis

Grebes
Order: PodicipediformesFamily: Podicipedidae

Grebes are small to medium-large freshwater diving birds. They have lobed toes and are excellent swimmers and divers. However, they have their feet placed far back on the body, making them quite ungainly on land.

Little grebe, Tachybaptus ruficollis (A)
Australasian grebe, Tachybaptus novaehollandiae
Hoary-headed grebe, Poliocephalus poliocephalus
Great crested grebe, Podiceps cristatus

Pigeons and doves
Order: ColumbiformesFamily: Columbidae

Pigeons and doves are stout-bodied birds with short necks and short slender bills with a fleshy cere.

Rock pigeon, Columba livia (I) 
Spotted dove, Streptopelia chinensis (I)
Pacific emerald dove, Chalcophaps longirostris
Common bronzewing, Phaps chalcoptera 
Flock bronzewing, Phaps histrionica  
Crested pigeon, Ocyphaps lophotes 
Spinifex pigeon, Geophaps plumifera 
Partridge pigeon, Geophaps smithii 
Chestnut-quilled rock-pigeon, Petrophassa rufipennis (E)
White-quilled rock-pigeon, Petrophassa albipennis
Diamond dove, Geopelia cuneata 
Peaceful dove, Geopelia placida
Bar-shouldered dove, Geopelia humeralis 
Black-banded fruit-dove, Ptilinopus alligator (E)
Rose-crowned fruit-dove, Ptilinopus regina 
Elegant imperial-pigeon, Ducula concinna (A)
Torresian imperial-pigeon, Ducula spilorrhoa 

Bustards
Order: OtidiformesFamily: Otididae

Bustards are large terrestrial birds mainly associated with dry open country and steppes in the Old World. They are omnivorous and nest on the ground. They walk steadily on strong legs and big toes, pecking for food as they go. They have long broad wings with "fingered" wingtips and striking patterns in flight. Many have interesting mating displays.

Australian bustard, Ardeotis australisCuckoos
Order: CuculiformesFamily: Cuculidae

The family Cuculidae includes cuckoos, roadrunners and anis. These birds are of variable size with slender bodies, long tails and strong legs. The Old World cuckoos are brood parasites.

Pheasant coucal, Centropus phasianinusPacific koel, Eudynamys orientalis 
Channel-billed cuckoo, Scythrops novaehollandiaeHorsfield's bronze-cuckoo, Chrysococcyx basalisBlack-eared cuckoo, Chrysococcyx osculans 
Little bronze-cuckoo, Chrysococcyx minutillusPallid cuckoo, Cuculus pallidusBrush cuckoo, Cacomantis variolosusOriental cuckoo, Cuculus optatusFrogmouths
Order: CaprimulgiformesFamily: Podargidae

The frogmouths are a distinctive group of small nocturnal birds related to swifts found from India across southern Asia to Australia.

Tawny frogmouth, Podargus strigoidesNightjars and allies
Order: CaprimulgiformesFamily: Caprimulgidae

Nightjars are medium-sized nocturnal birds that usually nest on the ground. They have long wings, short legs and very short bills. Most have small feet, of little use for walking, and long pointed wings. Their soft plumage is camouflaged to resemble bark or leaves.

Spotted nightjar, Eurostopodus argusLarge-tailed nightjar, Caprimulgus macrurusOwlet-nightjars
Order: CaprimulgiformesFamily: Aegothelidae

The owlet-nightjars are a distinctive group of small nocturnal birds related to swifts found from the Maluku Islands and New Guinea to Australia and New Caledonia.

Australian owlet-nightjar, Aegotheles cristatusSwifts
Order: CaprimulgiformesFamily: Apodidae

Swifts are small birds which spend the majority of their lives flying. These birds have very short legs and never settle voluntarily on the ground, perching instead only on vertical surfaces. Many swifts have long swept-back wings which resemble a crescent or boomerang.

White-throated needletail, Hirundapus caudacutusWhite-nest swiftlet, Aerodramus fuciphagus (A)
Pacific swift, Apus pacificusHouse swift, Apus nipalensis (A)

Rails, gallinules, and coots
Order: GruiformesFamily: Rallidae

Rallidae is a large family of small to medium-sized birds which includes the rails, crakes, coots and gallinules. Typically they inhabit dense vegetation in damp environments near lakes, swamps or rivers. In general they are shy and secretive birds, making them difficult to observe. Most species have strong legs and long toes which are well adapted to soft uneven surfaces. They tend to have short, rounded wings and to be weak fliers.

Lewin's rail, Lewinia pectoralis (A)
Chestnut rail, Gallirallus castaneoventrisBuff-banded rail, Gallirallus philippensisBlack-tailed nativehen, Tribonyx ventralisAustralian crake, Porzana fluminea 
Dusky moorhen, Gallinula tenebrosaEurasian coot, Fulica atraAustralasian swamphen, Porphyrio melanotusWhite-browed crake, Poliolimnas cinereusPale-vented bush-hen, Amaurornis moluccanaBaillon's crake, Zapornia pusillaSpotless crake, Zapornia tabuensisCranes
Order: GruiformesFamily: Gruidae

Cranes are large, long-legged and long-necked birds. Unlike the similar-looking but unrelated herons, cranes fly with necks outstretched, not pulled back. Most have elaborate and noisy courting displays or "dances".

Sarus crane, Antigone antigoneBrolga, Antigone rubicundaThick-knees
Order: CharadriiformesFamily: Burhinidae

The thick-knees are a group of largely tropical waders in the family Burhinidae. They are found worldwide within the tropical zone, with some species also breeding in temperate Europe and Australia. They are medium to large waders with strong black or yellow-black bills, large yellow eyes and cryptic plumage. Despite being classed as waders, most species have a preference for arid or semi-arid habitats.

Bush thick-knee, Burhinus grallarius 
Beach thick-knee, Esacus magnirostris (A)

Stilts and avocets
Order: CharadriiformesFamily: Recurvirostridae

Recurvirostridae is a family of large wading birds, which includes the avocets and stilts. The avocets have long legs and long up-curved bills. The stilts have extremely long legs and long, thin straight bills.

Pied stilt, Himantopus leucocephalusBanded stilt, Cladorhynchus leucocephalus 
Red-necked avocet, Recurvirostra novaehollandiaeOystercatchers
Order: CharadriiformesFamily: Haematopodidae

The oystercatchers are large and noisy plover-like birds, with strong bills used for smashing or prising open molluscs.

Pied oystercatcher, Haematopus longirostrisSooty oystercatcher, Haematopus fuliginosusPlovers and lapwings
Order: CharadriiformesFamily: Charadriidae

The family Charadriidae includes the plovers, dotterels and lapwings. They are small to medium-sized birds with compact bodies, short, thick necks and long, usually pointed, wings. They are found in open country worldwide, mostly in habitats near water.

Black-bellied plover, Pluvialis squatarolaPacific golden-plover, Pluvialis fulvaBanded lapwing, Vanellus tricolor 
Masked lapwing, Vanellus milesLesser sand-plover, Charadrius mongolusGreater sand-plover, Charadrius leschenaultiiCaspian plover, Charadrius asiaticus (A)
Double-banded plover, Charadrius bicinctus (A)
Red-capped plover, Charadrius ruficapillusKentish plover, Charadrius alexandrinus (A)
Common ringed plover, Charadrius hiaticula (A)
Little ringed plover, Charadrius dubius (A)
Oriental plover, Charadrius veredusRed-kneed dotterel, Erythrogonys cinctus  
Black-fronted dotterel, Elseyornis melanopsInland dotterel, Peltohyas australisPainted-snipes
Order: CharadriiformesFamily: Rostratulidae

Painted-snipes are short-legged, long-billed birds similar in shape to the true snipes, but more brightly coloured.

Australian painted-snipe, Rostratula australisJacanas
Order: CharadriiformesFamily: Jacanidae

The jacanas are a group of waders found throughout the tropics. They are identifiable by their huge feet and claws which enable them to walk on floating vegetation in the shallow lakes that are their preferred habitat.

Comb-crested jacana, Irediparra gallinaceaSandpipers and allies
Order: CharadriiformesFamily: Scolopacidae

Scolopacidae is a large diverse family of small to medium-sized shorebirds including the sandpipers, curlews, godwits, shanks, tattlers, woodcocks, snipes, dowitchers, and phalaropes. The majority of these species eat small invertebrates picked out of the mud or soil. Variation in length of legs and bills enables multiple species to feed in the same habitat, particularly on the coast, without direct competition for food.

Whimbrel, Numenius phaeopusLittle curlew, Numenius minutus (A)
Far Eastern curlew, Numenius madagascariensisBar-tailed godwit, Limosa lapponicaBlack-tailed godwit, Limosa limosaRuddy turnstone, Arenaria interpresGreat knot, Calidris tenuirostrisRed knot, Calidris canutusRuff, Calidris pugnaxBroad-billed sandpiper, Calidris falcinellusSharp-tailed sandpiper, Calidris acuminataStilt sandpiper, Calidris himantopus (A)
Curlew sandpiper, Calidris ferrugineaLong-toed stint, Calidris subminutaRed-necked stint, Calidris ruficollisSanderling, Calidris albaBaird's sandpiper, Calidris bairdii (A)
Little stint, Calidris minuta (A)
Pectoral sandpiper, Calidris melanotosAsian dowitcher, Limnodromus semipalmatus 
Latham's snipe, Gallinago hardwickiiPin-tailed snipe, Gallinago stenura (A)
Swinhoe's snipe, Gallinago megala 
Terek sandpiper, Xenus cinereusRed-necked phalarope, Phalaropus lobatusRed phalarope, Phalaropus fulicarius (A)
Common sandpiper, Actitis hypoleucosGreen sandpiper, Tringa ochropus (A)
Gray-tailed tattler, Tringa brevipesWandering tattler, Tringa incanaSpotted redshank, Tringa erythropus (A)
Common greenshank, Tringa nebulariaMarsh sandpiper, Tringa stagnatilisWood sandpiper, Tringa glareolaCommon redshank, Tringa totanus (A)

Buttonquail
Order: CharadriiformesFamily: Turnicidae

The buttonquails are small, drab, running birds which resemble the true quails. The female is the brighter of the sexes and initiates courtship. The male incubates the eggs and tends the young.

Red-backed buttonquail, Turnix maculosus 
Chestnut-backed buttonquail, Turnix castanotusRed-chested buttonquail, Turnix pyrrhothorax 
Little buttonquail, Turnix veloxPratincoles and coursers
Order: CharadriiformesFamily: Glareolidae

Glareolidae is a family of wading birds comprising the pratincoles, which have short legs, long pointed wings, and long forked tails, and the coursers, which have long legs, short wings, and long, pointed bills which curve downwards.

Australian pratincole, Stiltia isabellaOriental pratincole, Glareola maldivarumSkuas and jaegers
Order: CharadriiformesFamily: Stercorariidae

The family Stercorariidae are, in general, medium to large birds, typically with grey or brown plumage, often with white markings on the wings. They nest on the ground in temperate and arctic regions and are long-distance migrants.

Pomarine jaeger, Stercorarius pomarinusParasitic jaeger, Stercorarius parasiticusLong-tailed jaeger, Stercorarius longicaudus (A)

Gulls, terns, and skimmers
Order: CharadriiformesFamily: Laridae

Laridae is a family of medium to large seabirds, the gulls, terns, and skimmers. Gulls are typically grey or white, often with black markings on the head or wings. They have stout, longish bills and webbed feet. Terns are a group of generally medium to large seabirds typically with grey or white plumage, often with black markings on the head. Most terns hunt fish by diving but some pick insects off the surface of fresh water. Terns are generally long-lived birds, with several species known to live in excess of 30 years. Skimmers are a small family of tropical tern-like birds. They have an elongated lower mandible which they use to feed by flying low over the water surface and skimming the water for small fish.

Sabine's gull, Xema sabini (A)
Silver gull, Chroicocephalus novaehollandiaeBlack-headed gull, Chroicocephalus ridibundus (A)
Franklin's gull, Leucophaeus pipixcan (A)
Black-tailed gull, Larus crassirostris (A) 
Lesser black-backed gull, Larus fuscus (A) 
Brown noddy, Anous stolidus 
Black noddy, Anous minutus (A)
Sooty tern, Onychoprion fuscatus 
Bridled tern, Onychoprion anaethetus 
Little tern, Sternula albifronsGull-billed tern, Gelochelidon niloticaCaspian tern, Hydroprogne caspiaWhite-winged tern, Chlidonias leucopterusWhiskered tern, Chlidonias hybridaRoseate tern, Sterna dougalliiBlack-naped tern, Sterna sumatranaCommon tern, Sterna hirundoGreat crested tern, Thalasseus bergiiLesser crested tern, Thalasseus bengalensisTropicbirds
Order: PhaethontiformesFamily: Phaethontidae

Tropicbirds are slender white birds of tropical oceans, with exceptionally long central tail feathers. Their long wings have black markings, as does the head.

White-tailed tropicbird, Phaethon lepturus (A)
Red-tailed tropicbird, Phaethon rubricauda (A)

Southern storm-petrels
Order: ProcellariiformesFamily: Oceanitidae

The southern storm-petrels are the smallest seabirds, relatives of the petrels, feeding on planktonic crustaceans and small fish picked from the surface, typically while hovering. Their flight is fluttering and sometimes bat-like.

Wilson's storm-petrel, Oceanites oceanicusNorthern storm-petrels
Order: ProcellariiformesFamily: Hydrobatidae

Though the members of this family are similar in many respects to the southern storm-petrels, including their general appearance and habits, there are enough genetic differences to warrant their placement in a separate family.

Matsudaira's storm-petrel, Hydrobates matsudairae (A)

Shearwaters and petrels
Order: ProcellariiformesFamily: Procellariidae

The procellariids are the main group of medium-sized "true petrels", characterised by united nostrils with medium nasal septum, and a long outer functional primary flight feather.

Tahiti petrel, Pseudobulweria rostrata 
Streaked shearwater, Calonectris leucomelasWedge-tailed shearwater, Ardenna pacifica 
Sooty shearwater, Ardenna grisea (A)
Short-tailed shearwater, Ardenna tenuirostrisHutton's shearwater, Puffinus huttoni (A)
Tropical shearwater, Puffinus bailloni (A)

Storks
Order: CiconiiformesFamily: Ciconiidae

Storks are large, long-legged, long-necked, wading birds with long, stout bills. Storks are mute, but bill-clattering is an important mode of communication at the nest. Their nests can be large and may be reused for many years.

Black-necked stork, Ephippiorhynchus asiaticusFrigatebirds
Order: SuliformesFamily: Fregatidae

Frigatebirds are large seabirds usually found over tropical oceans. They are large, black, or black-and-white, with long wings and deeply forked tails. The males have coloured inflatable throat pouches. They do not swim or walk and cannot take off from a flat surface. Having the largest wingspan-to-body-weight ratio of any bird, they are essentially aerial, able to stay aloft for more than a week.

Lesser frigatebird, Fregata ariel 
Christmas Island frigatebird, Fregata andrewsi (A)
Great frigatebird, Fregata minorBoobies and gannets
Order: SuliformesFamily: Sulidae

The sulids comprise the gannets and boobies. Both groups are medium-large coastal seabirds that plunge-dive for fish.

Masked booby, Sula dactylatraBrown booby, Sula leucogaster 
Red-footed booby, Sula sula (A)
Abbott's booby, Papasula abbotti (A)

Anhingas
Order: SuliformesFamily: Anhingidae

Anhingas or darters are cormorant-like water birds with long necks and long, straight bills. They are fish eaters which often swim with only their neck above the water.

Australasian darter, Anhinga novaehollandiaeCormorants and shags
Order: SuliformesFamily: Phalacrocoracidae

Cormorants are medium-to-large aquatic birds, usually with mainly dark plumage and areas of coloured skin on the face. The bill is long, thin and sharply hooked. Their feet are four-toed and webbed, a distinguishing feature among the order Pelecaniformes.

Little pied cormorant, Microcarbo melanoleucosGreat cormorant, Phalacrocorax carboLittle black cormorant, Phalacrocorax sulcirostrisPied cormorant, Phalacrocorax variusPelicans
Order: PelecaniformesFamily: Pelecanidae

Pelicans are large water birds with distinctive pouches under their bills. Like other birds in the order Pelecaniformes, they have four webbed toes.

Australian pelican, Pelecanus conspicillatusHerons, egrets, and bitterns 
Order: PelecaniformesFamily: Ardeidae

The family Ardeidae contains the bitterns, herons, and egrets. Herons and egrets are medium to large wading birds with long necks and legs. Bitterns tend to be shorter necked and more wary. Members of Ardeidae fly with their necks retracted, unlike other long-necked birds such as storks, ibises, and spoonbills.

Black-backed bittern, Ixobrychus dubius (A)
Black bittern, Ixobrychus flavicollis 
Pacific heron, Ardea pacificaGreat-billed heron, Ardea sumatranaGreat egret, Ardea albaIntermediate egret, Ardea intermediaWhite-faced heron, Egretta novaehollandiaeLittle egret, Egretta garzettaPacific reef-heron, Egretta sacra 
Pied heron, Egretta picata 
Cattle egret, Bubulcus ibisChinese pond-heron, Ardeola bacchus (A)
Javan pond-heron, Ardeola speciosa (A)
Striated heron, Butorides striata 
Nankeen night-heron, Nycticorax caledonicusIbises and spoonbills
Order: PelecaniformesFamily: Threskiornithidae

Threskiornithidae is a family of large terrestrial and wading birds which includes the ibises and spoonbills. They have long, broad wings with 11 primary and about 20 secondary feathers. They are strong fliers and despite their size and weight, very capable soarers.

Glossy ibis, Plegadis falcinellusAustralian ibis, Threskiornis moluccusStraw-necked ibis, Threskiornis spinicollisRoyal spoonbill, Platalea regiaYellow-billed spoonbill, Platalea flavipesOsprey
Order: AccipitriformesFamily: Pandionidae

The family Pandionidae contains only one species, the osprey. The osprey is a medium-large raptor which is a specialist fish-eater with a worldwide distribution.

Osprey, Pandion haliaetusHawks, eagles, and kites
Order: AccipitriformesFamily: Accipitridae

Accipitridae is a family of birds of prey, which includes hawks, eagles, kites, harriers and Old World vultures. These birds have powerful hooked beaks for tearing flesh from their prey, strong legs, powerful talons and keen eyesight.

Black-shouldered kite, Elanus axillaris 
Letter-winged kite, Elanus scriptus 
Oriental honey-buzzard, Pernis ptilorhynchus (A)
Black-breasted kite, Hamirostra melanosternon 
Square-tailed kite, Lophoictinia isura 
Pacific baza, Aviceda subcristata 
Little eagle, Hieraaetus morphnoidesWedge-tailed eagle, Aquila audaxSwamp harrier, Circus approximansSpotted harrier, Circus assimilisGray goshawk, Accipiter novaehollandiaeBrown goshawk, Accipiter fasciatusCollared sparrowhawk, Accipiter cirrocephalusRed goshawk, Erythrotriorchis radiatusBlack kite, Milvus migransWhistling kite, Haliastur sphenurusBrahminy kite, Haliastur indus 
White-bellied sea-eagle, Haliaeetus leucogasterBarn-owls
Order: StrigiformesFamily: Tytonidae

Barn-owls are medium to large owls with large heads and characteristic heart-shaped faces. They have long strong legs with powerful talons.

Australian masked-owl, Tyto novaehollandiaeAustralasian grass-owl, Tyto longimembris 
Barn owl, Tyto albaOwls
Order: StrigiformesFamily: Strigidae

The typical owls are small to large solitary nocturnal birds of prey. They have large forward-facing eyes and ears, a hawk-like beak, and a conspicuous circle of feathers around each eye called a facial disk.

Rufous owl, Ninox rufa 
Barking owl, Ninox connivensSouthern boobook, Ninox boobookHoopoes
Order: BucerotiformesFamily: Upupidae

Hoopoes have black, white, and orangey-pink colouring with a large erectile crest on their head.

 Eurasian hoopoe, Upupa epops (A)

Kingfishers
Order: CoraciiformesFamily: Alcedinidae

Kingfishers are medium-sized birds with large heads, long pointed bills, short legs, and stubby tails.

Azure kingfisher, Ceyx azureusLittle kingfisher, Ceyx pusillusBlue-winged kookaburra, Dacelo leachii 
Red-backed kingfisher, Todiramphus pyrrhopygius 
Forest kingfisher, Todiramphus macleayiiTorresian kingfisher, Todiramphus sordidus 
Sacred kingfisher, Todiramphus sanctusBee-eaters
Order: CoraciiformesFamily: Meropidae

The bee-eaters are a group of near passerine birds in the family Meropidae. Most species are found in Africa but others occur in southern Europe, Madagascar, Australia, and New Guinea. They are characterised by richly coloured plumage, slender bodies, and usually elongated central tail feathers. All are colourful and have long downturned bills and pointed wings, which give them a swallow-like appearance when seen from afar.

Rainbow bee-eater, Merops ornatusRollers
Order: CoraciiformesFamily: Coraciidae

Rollers resemble crows in size and build, but are more closely related to the kingfishers and bee-eaters. They share the colourful appearance of those groups with blues and browns predominating. The two inner front toes are connected, but the outer toe is not.

Dollarbird, Eurystomus orientalisFalcons and caracaras
Order: FalconiformesFamily: Falconidae

Falconidae is a family of diurnal birds of prey. They differ from hawks, eagles, and kites in that they kill with their beaks instead of their talons.

Nankeen kestrel, Falco cenchroidesAustralian hobby, Falco longipennisBrown falcon, Falco berigoraGray falcon, Falco hypoleucos 
Black falcon, Falco subniger 
Peregrine falcon, Falco peregrinusCockatoos
Order: PsittaciformesFamily:  Cacatuidae

The cockatoos share many features with other parrots including the characteristic curved beak shape and a zygodactyl foot, with two forward toes and two backwards toes. They differ, however in a number of characteristics, including the often spectacular movable headcrest.

Red-tailed black-cockatoo, Calyptorhynchus banksii 
Pink cockatoo, Lophochroa leadbeateri 
Galah, Eolophus roseicapillaLong-billed corella, Cacatua tenuirostris (I)
Little corella, Cacatua sanguineaSulphur-crested cockatoo, Cacatua galeritaCockatiel, Nymphicus hollandicusOld World parrots
Order: PsittaciformesFamily: Psittaculidae

Characteristic features of parrots include a strong curved bill, an upright stance, strong legs, and clawed zygodactyl feet. Many parrots are vividly coloured, and some are multi-coloured. Old World parrots are found from Africa east across south and southeast Asia and Oceania to Australia and New Zealand.

 
Princess parrot, Polytelis alexandrae 
Red-winged parrot, Aprosmictus erythropterus 
Night parrot, Pezoporus occidentalis 
Bourke's parrot, Neophema bourkii 
Scarlet-chested parrot, Neophema splendidaAustralian ringneck, Barnardius barnardiNorthern rosella, Platycercus venustus 
Red-rumped parrot, Psephotus haematonotus (A)
Mulga parrot, Psephotus variusHooded parrot, Psephotus dissimilis (E)
Budgerigar, Melopsittacus undulatus 
Varied lorikeet, Psitteuteles versicolor 
Coconut lorikeet, Trichoglossus haematodus 
Rainbow lorikeet, Trichoglossus moluccanusRed-collared lorikeet, Trichoglossus rubritorquisPittas
Order: PasseriformesFamily: Pittidae

Pittas are medium-sized by passerine standards and are stocky, with fairly long, strong legs, short tails, and stout bills. Many are brightly coloured. They spend the majority of their time on wet forest floors, eating snails, insects, and similar invertebrates.

Rainbow pitta, 	Pitta irisBowerbirds
Order: PasseriformesFamily: Ptilonorhynchidae

The bowerbirds are small to medium-sized passerine birds. The males notably build a bower to attract a mate. Depending on the species, the bower ranges from a circle of cleared earth with a small pile of twigs in the center to a complex and highly decorated structure of sticks and leaves.

Western bowerbird, Chlamydera guttata 
Great bowerbird, Chlamydera nuchalisAustralasian treecreepers
Order: PasseriformesFamily: Climacteridae

The Climacteridae are medium-small, mostly brown-coloured birds with patterning on their underparts.

White-browed treecreeper, Climacteris affinis 
Black-tailed treecreeper, Climacteris melanurusFairywrens
Order: PasseriformesFamily: Maluridae

Maluridae is a family of small, insectivorous passerine birds endemic to Australia and New Guinea. They are socially monogamous and sexually promiscuous, meaning that although they form pairs between one male and one female, each partner will mate with other individuals and even assist in raising the young from such pairings.

Rufous grasswren, Amytornis whitei 
Striated grasswren, Amytornis striatus 
White-throated grasswren, Amytornis woodwardi (E)
Carpentarian grasswren, Amytornis dorotheae'
Short-tailed grasswren, Amytornis merrotsyi 
Thick-billed grasswren, Amytornis modestus (E)
Eyrean grasswren, Amytornis goyderi
Dusky grasswren, Amytornis purnelli
Rufous-crowned emuwren, Stipiturus ruficeps 
Purple-crowned fairywren, Malurus coronatus 
Purple-backed fairywren, Malurus assimilis 
Splendid fairywren, Malurus splendens
White-winged fairywren, Malurus leucopterus 
Red-backed fairywren, Malurus melanocephalus

HoneyeatersOrder: PasseriformesFamily: Meliphagidae

The honeyeaters are a large and diverse family of small to medium-sized birds most common in Australia and New Guinea. They are nectar feeders and closely resemble other nectar-feeding passerines.

Pied honeyeater, Certhionyx variegatus 
White-lined honeyeater, Territornis albilineata (E)
White-gaped honeyeater, Stomiopera unicolor 
White-fronted honeyeater, Purnella albifrons 
Yellow-throated miner, Manorina flavigula 
Spiny-cheeked honeyeater, Acanthagenys rufogularis
Singing honeyeater, Gavicalis virescens 
White-plumed honeyeater, Ptilotula penicillata
Yellow-tinted honeyeater, Ptilotula flavescens
Gray-headed honeyeater, Ptilotula keartlandi 
Gray-fronted honeyeater, Ptilotula plumula 
Bar-breasted honeyeater, Ramsayornis fasciatus 
Rufous-banded honeyeater, Conopophila albogularis 
Rufous-throated honeyeater, Conopophila rufogularis 
Gray honeyeater, Conopophila whitei 
Gibber chat, Ashbyia lovensis 
Yellow chat, Epthianura crocea 
Crimson chat, Epthianura tricolor 
Orange chat, Epthianura aurifrons  
Black honeyeater, Sugomel niger
Dusky myzomela, Myzomela obscura
Red-headed myzomela, Myzomela erythrocephala
Banded honeyeater, Cissomela pectoralis
Brown honeyeater, Lichmera indistincta 
Blue-faced honeyeater, Entomyzon cyanotis
White-throated honeyeater, Melithreptus albogularis 
Black-chinned honeyeater, Melithreptus gularis 
Painted honeyeater, Grantiella picta 
Little friarbird, Philemon citreogularis
Helmeted friarbird, Philemon buceroides
Silver-crowned friarbird, Philemon argenticeps

PardalotesOrder: PasseriformesFamily: Pardalotidae

Pardalotes spend most of their time high in the outer foliage of trees, feeding on insects, spiders, and above all lerps (a type of sap-sucking insect).

Red-browed pardalote, Pardalotus rubricatus 
Striated pardalote, Pardalotus striatus

Thornbills and alliesOrder: PasseriformesFamily: Acanthizidae

Thornbills are small passerine birds, similar in habits to the tits.

Redthroat, Pyrrholaemus brunneus 
Rufous fieldwren, Calamanthus campestris (A)
Slender-billed thornbill, Acanthiza iredalei extirpated
Inland thornbill, Acanthiza apicalis 
Yellow-rumped thornbill, Acanthiza chrysorrhoa 
Chestnut-rumped thornbill, Acanthiza uropygialis 
Slaty-backed thornbill, Acanthiza robustirostris 
Weebill, Smicrornis brevirostris 
Green-backed gerygone, Gerygone chloronota
White-throated gerygone, Gerygone olivacea
Large-billed gerygone, Gerygone magnirostris
Western gerygone, Gerygone fusca 
Mangrove gerygone, Gerygone levigaster
Southern whiteface, Aphelocephala leucopsis
Banded whiteface, Aphelocephala nigricincta

Pseudo-babblersOrder: PasseriformesFamily: Pomatostomidae

The pseudo-babblers are small to medium-sized birds endemic to Australia and New Guinea. They are ground-feeding omnivores and highly social.

Gray-crowned babbler, Pomatostomus temporalis
White-browed babbler, Pomatostomus superciliosus

Quail-thrushes and jewel-babblersOrder: PasseriformesFamily: Cinclosomatidae

The Cinclosomatidae is a family containing jewel-babblers and quail-thrushes.

Copperback quail-thrush, Cinclosoma clarum 
Western quail-thrush, Cinclosoma marginatum
Cinnamon quail-thrush, Cinclosoma cinnamomeum

CuckooshrikesOrder: PasseriformesFamily: Campephagidae

The cuckooshrikes are small to medium-sized passerine birds. They are predominantly greyish with white and black, although some species are brightly coloured.

Ground cuckooshrike, Coracina maxima
Black-faced cuckooshrike, Coracina novaehollandiae
White-bellied cuckooshrike, Coracina papuensis
White-winged triller, Lalage tricolor
Varied triller, Lalage leucomela
Common cicadabird,  Edolisoma tenuirostre

SittellasOrder: PasseriformesFamily: Neosittidae

The sittellas are a family of small passerine birds found only in Australasia. They resemble treecreepers, but have soft tails.

Varied sittella, Neositta chrysoptera

Whipbirds and wedgebillsOrder: PasseriformesFamily: Psophodidae

The Psophodidae is a family containing whipbirds and wedgebills.

Chiming wedgebill, Psophodes occidentalis
Chirruping wedgebill, Psophodes cristatus

Australo-Papuan bellbirdsOrder: PasseriformesFamily: Oreoicidae

The three species contained in the family have been moved around between  different families for fifty years. A series of studies of the DNA of Australian birds between 2006 and 2001 found strong support for treating the three genera as a new family, which was formally named in 2016.

Crested bellbird, Oreoica gutturalis

Shrike-titsOrder: PasseriformesFamily: Falcunculidae

The shrike-tits have a parrot-like bill, used for distinctive bark-stripping behaviour, which gains it access to invertebrates

Northern shrike-tit, Falcunculus whitei

Whistlers and alliesOrder: PasseriformesFamily: Pachycephalidae

The family Pachycephalidae includes the whistlers, shrikethrushes, and some of the pitohuis.

Sandstone shrikethrush, Colluricincla woodwardi
Gray shrikethrush, Colluricincla harmonica
Arafura shrikethrush, Colluricincla megarhyncha
Rufous shrikethrush, Colluricincla rufogaster
Black-tailed whistler, Pachycephala melanura
Gray whistler, Pachycephala simplex
Rufous whistler, Pachycephala rufiventris
White-breasted whistler, Pachycephala lanioides

Old World oriolesOrder: PasseriformesFamily: Oriolidae

The Old World orioles are colourful passerine birds. They are not related to the New World orioles.

Olive-backed oriole, Oriolus sagittatus
Green oriole, Oriolus flavocinctus
Australasian figbird, Sphecotheres vieilloti

Woodswallows, bellmagpies, and alliesOrder: PasseriformesFamily: Artamidae

The woodswallows are soft-plumaged, somber-coloured passerine birds. They are smooth, agile flyers with moderately large, semi-triangular wings. The cracticids: currawongs, bellmagpies and butcherbirds, are similar to the other corvids. They have large, straight bills and mostly black, white or grey plumage. All are omnivorous to some degree.

White-breasted woodswallow, Artamus leucorynchus
Masked woodswallow, Artamus personatus 
White-browed woodswallow, Artamus superciliosus 
Black-faced woodswallow, Artamus cinereus
Little woodswallow, Artamus minor
Gray butcherbird, Cracticus torquatus 
Silver-backed butcherbird, Cracticus argenteus
Pied butcherbird, Cracticus nigrogularis
Black butcherbird, Cracticus quoyi
Australian magpie, Gymnorhina tibicen
Gray currawong, Strepera versicolor

FantailsOrder: PasseriformesFamily: Rhipiduridae

The fantails are small insectivorous birds which are specialist aerial feeders.

Northern fantail, Rhipidura rufiventris
Willie-wagtail, Rhipidura leucophrys
Arafura fantail, Rhipidura dryas
Gray fantail, Rhipidura albiscapa
Mangrove fantail, Rhipidura phasiana

DrongosOrder: PasseriformesFamily: Dicruridae

The drongos are mostly black or dark grey in colour, sometimes with metallic tints. They have long forked tails, and some Asian species have elaborate tail decorations. They have short legs and sit very upright when perched, like a shrike. They flycatch or take prey from the ground.

Spangled drongo, Dicrurus bracteatus

Monarch flycatchersOrder: PasseriformesFamily: Monarchidae

The monarch flycatchers are small to medium-sized insectivorous passerines which hunt by flycatching.

Spectacled monarch, Symposiachrus trivirgatus
Magpie-lark, Grallina cyanoleuca
Leaden flycatcher, Myiagra rubecula
Broad-billed flycatcher, Myiagra ruficollis
Satin flycatcher, Myiagra cyanoleuca (A)
Paperbark flycatcher, Myiagra nana 
Shining flycatcher, Myiagra alecto

White-winged chough and apostlebirdOrder: PasseriformesFamily: Corcoracidae

They are found in open habitat in eastern Australia, mostly open eucalypt woodlands and some forest that lacks a closed canopy. They are highly social, spend much of their time foraging through leaf litter with a very distinctive gait, calling to one another almost constantly
 
Apostlebird, Struthidea cinerea

Crows, jays, and magpiesOrder: PasseriformesFamily: Corvidae

The family Corvidae includes crows, ravens, jays, choughs, magpies, treepies, nutcrackers and ground jays. Corvids are above average in size among the Passeriformes, and some of the larger species show high levels of intelligence.

Torresian crow, Corvus orru 
Little crow, Corvus bennetti 
Australian raven, Corvus coronoides

Australasian robinsOrder: PasseriformesFamily: Petroicidae

Most species of Petroicidae have a stocky build with a large rounded head, a short straight bill and rounded wingtips. They occupy a wide range of wooded habitats, from subalpine to tropical rainforest, and mangrove swamp to semi-arid scrubland. All are primarily insectivores, although a few supplement their diet with seeds.

Jacky-winter, Microeca fascinans
Lemon-bellied flycatcher, Microeca flavigaster 
Red-capped robin, Petroica goodenovii 
Hooded robin, Melanodryas cucullata 
Mangrove robin, Eopsaltria pulverulenta
Buff-sided robin, Eopsaltria pulverulenta 
Northern scrub-robin, Drymodes superciliaris extirpated

LarksOrder: PasseriformesFamily: Alaudidae

Larks are small terrestrial birds with often extravagant songs and display flights. Most larks are fairly dull in appearance. Their food is insects and seeds.

Horsfield’s bushlark, Mirafra javanica

Cisticolas and alliesOrder: PasseriformesFamily: Cisticolidae

The Cisticolidae are warblers found mainly in warmer southern regions of the Old World. They are generally very small birds of drab brown or grey appearance found in open country such as grassland or scrub.

Zitting cisticola, Cisticola juncidis
Golden-headed cisticola, Cisticola exilis

Reed warblers and alliesOrder: PasseriformesFamily: Acrocephalidae

The members of this family are usually rather large for "warblers". Most are rather plain olivaceous brown above with much yellow to beige below. They are usually found in open woodland, reedbeds, or tall grass. The family occurs mostly in southern to western Eurasia and surroundings, but it also ranges far into the Pacific, with some species in Africa.

Oriental reed warbler, Acrocephalus orientalis  (A)
Australian reed warbler, Acrocephalus australis

Grassbirds and alliesOrder: PasseriformesFamily: Locustellidae

Locustellidae are a family of small insectivorous songbirds found mainly in Eurasia, Africa, and the Australian region. They are smallish birds with tails that are usually long and pointed, and tend to be drab brownish or buffy all over.

Spinifexbird, Poodytes carteri
Little grassbird, Poodytes gramineus
Brown songlark, Cincloramphus cruralis
Rufous songlark, Cincloramphus mathewsi 
Tawny grassbird, Cincloramphus timoriensis

SwallowsOrder: PasseriformesFamily: Hirundinidae

The family Hirundinidae is adapted to aerial feeding. They have a slender streamlined body, long pointed wings, and a short bill with a wide gape. The feet are adapted to perching rather than walking, and the front toes are partially joined at the base.

Barn swallow, Hirundo rustica
Welcome swallow, Hirundo neoxena
Red-rumped swallow, Cecropis daurica  (A)
Fairy martin, Petrochelidon ariel 
Tree martin, Petrochelidon nigricans
White-backed swallow, Cheramoeca leucosterna

White-eyes, yuhinas, and alliesOrder: PasseriformesFamily: Zosteropidae

The white-eyes are small birds of rather drab appearance, the plumage above being typically greenish-olive, but some species have a white or bright yellow throat, breast, or lower parts, and several have buff flanks. As the name suggests, many species have a white ring around each eye.

Australian yellow white-eye, Zosterops luteus
Silver-eye, Zosterops lateralis

StarlingsOrder: PasseriformesFamily: Sturnidae

Starlings are small to medium-sized passerine birds. Their flight is strong and direct and they are very gregarious. Their preferred habitat is fairly open country. They eat insects and fruit. Plumage is typically dark with a metallic sheen.

Metallic starling, Aplonis metallica 
European starling, Sturnus vulgaris (I)
Rosy starling, Pastor roseus (A)
Common myna, Acridotheres tristis (I)

FlowerpeckersOrder: PasseriformesFamily: Dicaeidae

The flowerpeckers are very small, stout, often brightly coloured birds, with short tails, short thick curved bills, and tubular tongues.

Mistletoebird, Dicaeum hirundinaceum

Sunbirds and spiderhuntersOrder: PasseriformesFamily: Nectariniidae

The sunbirds and spiderhunters are very small passerine birds which feed largely on nectar, although they will also take insects, especially when feeding young. Their flight is fast and direct on short wings. Most species can take nectar by hovering like a hummingbird, but usually perch to feed.

Olive-backed sunbird, Cinnyris jugularis

Waxbills and alliesOrder: PasseriformesFamily: Estrildidae

The estrildid finches are small passerine birds of the Old World tropics and Australasia. They are gregarious and often colonial seed eaters with short thick but pointed bills. They are all similar in structure and habits, but have wide variation in plumage colours and patterns.

Pictorella munia, Heteromunia pectoralis 
Crimson finch, Neochmia phaeton 
Painted firetail, Emblema pictum 
Star finch, Bathilda ruficauda
Double-barred finch, Stizoptera bichenovii
Zebra finch, Taeniopygia guttata
Masked finch, Poephila personata
Yellow-rumped munia, Lonchura flaviprymna
Chestnut-breasted munia, Lonchura castaneothorax
Gouldian finch, Chloebia gouldiae

Old World sparrowsOrder: PasseriformesFamily: Passeridae

Old World sparrows are small passerine birds, typically small, plump, brown or grey with short tails and short powerful beaks. They are seed-eaters, but also consume small insects.

House sparrow, Passer domesticus (I)
Eurasian tree sparrow, Passer montanus (I)

Wagtails and pipitsOrder: PasseriformesFamily': Motacillidae

Motacillidae is a family of small passerine birds with medium to long tails and comprises the wagtails, longclaws, and pipits. These are slender ground-feeding insectivores of open country.

Forest wagtail, Dendronanthus indicus (A)
Gray wagtail, Motacilla cinerea (A)
Eastern yellow wagtail, Motacilla tschutschensis (A)
Citrine wagtail, Motacilla citreola (A)
White wagtail, Motacilla alba (A)
Australian pipit, Anthus australis''

See also
List of birds
Lists of birds by region
List of birds of Australia

References